1992 saw many sequels and prequels in video games, such as Dragon Quest V, Final Fantasy V, Sonic the Hedgehog 2, Street Fighter II: Champion Edition, Super Mario Land 2: 6 Golden Coins, and Super Mario Kart, along with new titles such as Art of Fighting, Lethal Enforcers, Mortal Kombat and Virtua Racing.

The year's highest-grossing video game worldwide was Capcom's arcade fighting game Street Fighter II for the second year in a row, while also being the year's highest-grossing entertainment product. The year's best-selling home system was the Game Boy for the third year in a row, while the year's best-selling home video games were Sonic the Hedgehog 2 for the Sega Mega Drive/Genesis and the Super NES port of Street Fighter II, which were both also the year's highest-grossing home entertainment products.

Top-rated games

Game of the Year awards
The following titles won Game of the Year awards for 1992.

Famitsu Platinum Hall of Fame
The following video game releases in 1992 entered Famitsu magazine's "Platinum Hall of Fame" for receiving Famitsu scores of at least 35 out of 40.

Financial performance

Highest-grossing arcade games
The year's highest-grossing game worldwide was Street Fighter II, which alone accounted for an estimated 60% of the global arcade game market, according to Coinslot magazine. The following table lists the year's top-grossing arcade games in Japan, the United Kingdom, United States, and worldwide.

Japan
The following titles were the top ten highest-grossing arcade games of 1992 in Japan, according to Gamest, Game Machine and Famicom Tsūshin (Famitsu) magazines.

United States
In the United States, the following titles were the highest-grossing arcade video games of 1992.

Australia
On Australia's Timezone monthly arcade charts published in the June 1992 issue of Leisure Line magazine, Capcom's Street Fighter II: Champion Edition was the top-grossing arcade conversion kit and Konami's X-Men was the top-grossing dedicated arcade cabinet.

Best-selling home systems

Best-selling home video games 
Sonic the Hedgehog 2 and Street Fighter II each sold  units worldwide in 1992, making them the year's highest-grossing entertainment products. The following home video games sold more than 1 million units worldwide in 1992.

The following table lists the year's top-selling home video game releases in several markets, including Europe, Japan, South Korea, and the United States.

Asia
In Japan and South Korea, according to Famicom Tsūshin (Famitsu) magazine, the following titles were the top ten best-selling home video game releases of 1992.

Europe
The following titles were the top three best-selling home video game releases of 1992 in Europe and the United Kingdom.

In the United Kingdom, the following titles were the top-selling home video games of each month in 1992.

United States
In the United States, the following titles were the top three best-selling home video games of 1992.

The following titles were the best-selling home video games of each month for video game consoles (home consoles and handheld consoles) in 1992.

The following titles were the top-selling personal computer games on the monthly PC Research charts in 1992, as reported by Electronic Games magazine.

Events
 May 25 – FuncoLand founder David Pomije is named "Emerging Entrepreneur of the Year" by the TwinWest Chamber of Commerce.
 July 2 – FuncoLand's parent company Funco Inc. files a registration statement with the U.S. Securities and Exchange Commission for an initial public offering of one million shares of its common stock at $5 a share, with plans to use the proceeds from the sold shares to repay short-term debt and finance the opening of other FuncoLand locations.
 July 13 – The first Chicago-area FuncoLand location opens in Bloomingdale.
 August 12 – Funco's initial public offering, underwritten by Miller, Johnson & Kuehn Inc., is announced.
 September 22 – The first south suburban Chicago-area FuncoLand location opens in Orland Park.
 Atari Games Corp. v. Nintendo of America Inc.
 Lewis Galoob Toys, Inc. v. Nintendo of America, Inc.
 Sega v. Accolade
 Activision (as Mediagenic) files for Chapter 11 bankruptcy protection
 New companies: Wow Entertainment Inc. (Sega AM1), Humongous Entertainment, Halestorm

Hardware releases
 January 1 – Atari Corporation drops support for the Atari 2600, Atari 8-bit family, Atari 7800, and software for those systems.
 April 11 – European launch of the SNES.
 October – Sega releases the Model 1, Sega's first arcade system board supporting 3D polygon graphics.
 December – the Apple IIGS is discontinued, ending the Apple II series.
 Namco releases the System 22, an arcade system board that introduces 3D texture mapping and Gouraud shading.
 Philips releases the CD-i multimedia home console
 Super NES released in Europe and Australasia
 Sega releases the Mega CD as Sega CD (an add-on for the Genesis) in North America, almost a year after the equivalent Japanese launch
 JVC releases the Wondermega console in Japan, a combined Mega Drive and Mega CD.
 Turbo Technologies Incorporated (TTI) releases the TurboDuo, an updated version of the TurboGrafx-16 with built-in CD-ROM drive and Super System Card for Super CD-ROM² support.
 The Amiga 1200 computer is released. It's the final lower-cost Amiga model before Commodore's bankruptcy.
 Nintendo releases the Super Scope for the Super NES.

Game releases

January–March

April–June

July–September
 July 29 – Ecco the Dolphin is released, the first in the series.
 August 27 – Nintendo releases Super Mario Kart, the first in the Mario Kart series, creating the mascot/go-kart subgenre of racing games.
 September 1 – Domark releases Championship Manager for the Amiga and Atari ST.
 September 24 – SNK releases Art of Fighting for the arcades.
 September – Enix releases Dragon Quest V in Japan.

October–December
 October – Sega releases Virtua Racing by Yu Suzuki and AM2 in the arcades, laying the foundations for subsequent 3D racing games and popularizing 3D polygon graphics among a wider audience.
 October – Gremlin Graphics releases Zool for the Amiga, a character-based platformer following in the footsteps of Mario and Sonic. 
 October 8 – Midway Games releases the Mortal Kombat arcade game in North America, which features bloody "fatalities," digitized characters, and started a franchise of games and movies.
 October 15 – Sega releases the controversial Night Trap video game for the Sega CD console.
 October 21 – Super Mario Land 2: 6 Golden Coins is released for the Game Boy. The first appearance of Wario. 
 November – Accolade releases Star Control II.
November –  Konami releases a console port of Prince of Persia for the Super NES.
 November 21 – Sega publishes Sonic the Hedgehog 2 (Mega Drive/Genesis). The game introduced Sonic's sidekick Miles "Tails" Prower and Sonic's Super Sonic transformation.
 Interplay publishes Alone in the Dark, widely considered the first survival horror game and one of the first games with fully 3D polygonal characters.
 Flashback is released by Delphine Software on the Amiga. The game is praised for its rotoscoped animation, giving movements fluidity unusual for the time. It is listed in the Guinness World Records as the best-selling French game of all time.
 December – Dune II is released by Westwood Studios, creating the template for the modern real-time strategy genre.
 December 4 – Mega Man 5 is released in Japan. On December 15, Mega Man 5 is released in the US.
 December 10 – Fatal Fury 2 is released by SNK for the Neo Geo arcade and home platforms.

See also
1992 in games

References

 
Video games by year
video games